Whidbey can refer to:
Joseph Whidbey - a member of the Royal Navy who served on the Vancouver Expedition
 Whidbey, the Microsoft pre-release codename for Visual Studio 2005, as a reference to the island in the United States
Whidbey Telecom (Formerly Whidbey Telephone Company) a Telecommunications company operating on the south end of Whidbey Island and Point Roberts, Washington
, a US Navy dock landing ship

Places
All named after Joseph Whidbey:
Point Whidbey, headland in South Australia
Whidbey Isles, an island group in South Australia
Whidbey Isles Conservation Park, protected area associated with the South Australian island group
Whidbey Island, Washington, United States
Whidbey Reach, a segment of the Gardner Canal, British Columbia, Canada

See also
Whitby (disambiguation)